Kleinhovia hospita (guest tree syn. Kleinhovia serrata Blanco, Grewia meyeniana Walp.) is an evergreen, tropical tree native to Indonesia, Malaysia and other parts of tropical Asia.  It is monotypic, being the only species in the genus Kleinhovia.

Description 

Kleinhovia hospita is an evergreen, bushy tree growing up to 20 m high, with a dense rounded crown and upright pink sprays of flowers and fruits. Leaves are simple and alternate; stipules are ensiform to linear, about 8 mm long; petioles are 2.5–30 cm long; the leaf-blade is ovate to heart-shaped, glabrous on both sides, with the apex pointed. Secondary veins occur in 6-8 pairs, palmately nerved.

The flowers of K. hospita are terminal, in loose panicles protruding from the crown; flowers are about 5 mm wide, coloured pale pink; pedicels are 2–10 mm long; bracteoles are lanceolate, 2–4 mm long, pubescent; gynandrophores are 4–7 mm long, pubescent; there are 5 sepals, linear lanceolate, 6–8 mm long, pink, tomentose; 5 petals, inconspicuous, the upper one being yellow; 15 stamens, monaldelphous, 8–15 mm long, staminal tube broadly campanulate, adanate to gynandrophore, 5-lobed, each lobe having 3 anthers and alternating with staminodes; the anthers are sessile and extrorse; pistil occur with a 5-celled, pilose ovary, one style and a capitate, with a 5-lobed stigma. K. hospita flowers throughout the year.

Fruit production starts early, often in the third year after planting. The fruit of K. hospita are rounded, 5-lobed, thin-walled, membranous capsules, 2–2.5 cm in diameter, loculicidally dehiscent, each locule having 1–2 seeds. The seeds are globose, whitish, warty and exalbuminous. The fruits are more conspicuous than the flowers because of their abundance and size.

Uses 

Kleinhovia hospita is used as a traditional medicine in parts of Malaya, Indonesia and Papua New Guinea to treat scabies. The bark and leaves used as hairwash for lice, while the juice of the leaves are used as an eyewash. Young leaves are eaten as a vegetable. Bast fibres are used for making ropes used for tying or for tethering livestock.

The wood of K. hospita shows a pinkish buff and is moderately fine in texture, soft, light, easy to season, work and finish. Its energy value is about 19000 kJ/kg. The leaves and bark contain cyanogenic compounds that are assumed to help to kill ectoparasites such as lice. Extracts of the leaves have shown anti-tumour activity against sarcoma in mice. A number of fatty acids with a cyclopropenylic ring (scopoletin, kaempferol, and quercetin) have been isolated from the leaves.

Kleinhovia hospita is used for ornamental purposes: the attractiveness of the pink panicles accounts for its spread as an ornamental.

The tree bark of Kleinhovia hospita has a good potential as a reinforcement for Fiber Reinforced Composite because of its high mechanical strength.

Gallery

Notes

General references
Latiff, A., 1997. Kleinhovia hospita L. in Faridah Hanum, I. & van der Maesen, L.J.G. (Eds.): Plant Resources of South-East Asia No. 11. Auxiliary Plants. Prosea Foundation, Bogor, Indonesia; url source: Pl@ntUse.

External links

PLANTS Profile for Kleinhovia hospita (guest tree)
Aluka - Entry for Kleinhovia hospita Linn.

Byttnerioideae
Medicinal plants
Trees of China
Trees of Taiwan
Flora of tropical Asia
Flora of Queensland
Flora of French Polynesia
Trees of Fiji
Flora of American Samoa
Flora of Samoa
Malvales of Australia
Monotypic Malvales genera
Malvaceae genera
Flora without expected TNC conservation status